The 1994–95 Segunda División season saw 20 teams participate in the second flight Spanish league. CP Mérida, Rayo Vallecano and UD Salamanca were promoted to Primera División. Palamós CF and CD Orense were relegated to Segunda División B.

Teams

Teams by Autonomous Community

Final table

Results

Promotion play-offs

First leg

Second leg 

Segunda División seasons
2
Spain